Government cabinets of Bangladesh.

See also
Politics of Bangladesh
History of Bangladesh after independence
List of prime ministers of Bangladesh

References

 
Bangladesh
Bangladesh